Dariusz Joński (born 12 January 1979) is a Polish politician. He is currently a member of the Sejm, while in the past he served as a Deputy Mayor of Łódź.

Biography 
Joński studied economics on Łódź University of Technology. He also obtained a postgraduate degree in Law and Administration from the University of Łódź.

In 2000 Joński joined the Democratic Left Alliance. In 2006 local elections he was elected to the Łódź City Council. In 2010 he became a Deputy Mayor of Łódź. Later, he was chosen as the SLD's for the Mayor of Łódź. He lost in the second round to the Civic Platform's candidate Hanna Zdanowska after receiving 39.35% of total votes. During the same elections he was elected to the Łódź Regional Assembly.

During the 2011 Polish parliamentary election. Joński was elected to the Sejm from the Łódź constituency. On 30 May 2015, he became the Deputy Leader of the Democratic Left Alliance. He was a candidate of the United Left for the 2015 parliamentary election. He was not reelected as the coalition failed to pass the electoral threshold. He remained as the Deputy Leader until 23 January 2016. On 8 April 2017 he left the SLD.

Joński was one of the co-founders of the Polish Initiative with Barbara Nowacka. For the 2018 Polish local elections he became a candidate of the Civic Coalition. He was elected to the Łódź Regional Assembly. In 2019 Dariusz Joński became the member of the Polish Initiative after it was registered as a party. During the 2019 parliamentary election he was again a Civic Coalition's candidate. He was elected to Sejm, again from the Łódź constituency.

References

University of Łódź alumni
Polish Initiative
1979 births
Living people
Democratic Left Alliance politicians
Members of the Polish Sejm 2019–2023
Members of the Polish Sejm 2011–2015
Politicians from Łódź
Łódź University of Technology alumni